Corazón guerrero (English title: Daring Heart) is a Mexican telenovela that aired on Las Estrellas from 28 March 2022 to 9 September 2022. The series is produced by Salvador Mejía for TelevisaUnivision. It is an adaptation of the Argentine telenovela Valientes, and stars Alejandra Espinoza and Gonzalo García Vivanco.

Plot 
The telenovela follows the brothers, Jesús (Gonzalo García Vivanco), Damián (Rodrigo Guirao) and Samuel (Christian de la Campa), who are separated when their father dies and are given up for adoption to different families. Years later, Jesús manages to reunite with his brothers and, in front of their father's grave, they vow to punish Augusto Ruíz Montalvo (Diego Olivera) for destroying their family. To achieve their goal, the Guerrero brothers gain the trust of Augusto until they infiltrate his family. They decide to unleash the fury of their revenge on Augusto's daughters. Determined to fulfill the oath he swore before his father's tomb, Jesús will try to silence his feelings for Mariluz.

Cast

Main 
 Alejandra Espinoza as Mariluz García
 Gonzalo García Vivanco as Jesús Guerrero
 Altair Jarabo as Carlota Ruíz Montalvo
 Oka Giner as Doménica Ruíz
 Christian de la Campa as Samuel Guerrero
 Rodrigo Guirao as Damián Guerrero
 Diego Olivera as Augusto Ruíz Montalvo
 Sabine Moussier as Victoriana Peñalver
 René Casados as Heriberto Villalba
 Josh Gutiérrez as Federico Duarte
 Manuel Ojeda as Abel
 Aleida Núñez as Selena Recuero
 Ana Martín as Conchita García
 Natalia Esperón as Guadalupe García
 Karena Flores as Emma Ruíz
 Sian Chiong as Adrián
 Gabriela Spanic as Elisa

Recurring 
 Pablo Valentín as Valero
 Rafael del Villar as Gabino Beltrán
 Yekaterina Kiev as Micaela
 Sergio Acosta as Bautista
 Emilio Galván as Saúl
 Luis Lauro as Iker
 Cristian Gamero as Isaías Cabrera
 Pamela Cervantes as Fabiola
 Patricio de Rodas as Rodrigo
 Patricia Maqueo as Belén
 Raúl Ortero as Sergio
 Samantha Vázquez as Lola
 Fernanda Rivas as Renata
 Diego Arancivia as Gus
 Michelle Polanco as Laura
 José Luis Duval as Santiago
 Tanya Vázquez as Briana
 Juan Colucho as Patricio Salgado

Guest stars 
 Eduardo Yáñez as Octavio Sánchez

Production 
The telenovela was announced in October 2021 at Televisa's upfront for 2022. On 25 November 2021, Alejandra Espinoza and Gonzalo García Vivanco were announced in the lead roles. Filming began on 17 January 2022.

Ratings

Episodes

Notes

References

External links 
 

2022 telenovelas
2022 Mexican television series debuts
2022 Mexican television series endings
2020s Mexican television series
Televisa telenovelas
Mexican telenovelas
Spanish-language telenovelas
Mexican television series based on Argentine television series